Daisy Zamora (born 20 June 1950 in Managua, Nicaragua) is a contemporary Latin American poet. Her work covers daily life, human rights, politics, revolution, feminist issues, art, history and culture.

Early life and education
She was raised in a wealthy liberal and politically active family. She attended convent schools and studied at the Universidad Centroamericana in Nicaragua where she earned a degree in psychology. She earned a post graduate diploma from INCAE, a branch of Harvard University in Central America. She also studied at the Academia Dante Alighieri and the Escuela Nacional de Bellas Artes.

Work and activism
She was involved in the fight against the Somoza dictatorship in the 1970s, and joined the Sandinista National Liberation Front (FSLN) in 1973. She was exiled to Honduras, Panama and Costa Rica. During Nicaragua’s Sandinista Revolution, she was a combatant for the FSLN (Sandinista National Liberation Front), became the voice and program director for clandestine Radio Sandino during the final 1979 Sandinista offensive, then after the triumph of the revolution, was appointed vice minister of culture for the new government. 

She worked as Vice Minister of Culture with fellow poet and mentor Ernesto Cardenal, Minister of Culture to create and implement numerous programs that successfully revitalized the war damaged cultural life of Nicaragua, including a popular, highly successful national literacy program that brought books and reading, poetry, and visual arts to even the remotest areas of the country.

Author of numerous books of poetry in Spanish, as well as a collection of political essays, she also edited the first comprehensive anthology of Nicaraguan women poets published in Latin America.  Her latest poetry collection, La violenta espuma, was published in Madrid by renowned Spanish poetry publisher Visor in late December 2017.  Also recently, she was featured in director Jenny Murray’s award-winning documentary ¡Las Sandinistas!, soon to be aired on PBS.

Among her poetry books in English, The Violent Foam: New & Selected Poems, a bilingual collection, was published by Curbstone Press.  Life for Each, was published in England by Katabasis in 1994;  an earlier collection, Riverbed of Memory, was published by City Lights Books in 1992, and Clean Slate by Curbstone Press in 1993.

Her work has been published in magazines and literary newspapers in Latin America, the Caribbean, the U.S., Canada, Europe, Asia, Australia, and Viet Nam.  Her poetry has appeared in more than eighty anthologies in thirty languages, including the influential Oxford Book of Latin American Poetry.  She has given poetry readings and lectures throughout the world, at many venues in the U.S., and was a featured poet in Bill Moyer’s PBS series The Language of Life.

A political activist and advocate for women's rights throughout her life, for the last several years she has taught poetry workshops at a number of universities and colleges, and has been a lecturer of Latin American culture and literature for the Latin American & Latino Studies Department at the University of California, Santa Cruz, the University of San Francisco, and currently at San Francisco State University.  She has also served as a member of the jury for the Neustadt International Poetry Prize based in the U.S.

Early in her career she was awarded the prestigious Mariano Fiallos Gil National Poetry Prize of Nicaragua. She has been honored by the Nicaraguan Writers Center for valuable contributions to Nicaraguan Literature, and named Woman Writer of the Year by the Nicaraguan National Association of Artists.   In the U.S. she has received a California Arts Council Fellowship for poetry.  She has three children, and resides in Managua and San Francisco, where she lives with her husband, U.S. poet and writer George Evans.

External links
http://www.daisyzamora.net/
http://www.pbs.org/wgbh/poetryeverywhere/zamora.html
https://repositories.lib.utexas.edu/handle/2152/ETD-UT-2010-08-1858
https://archive.org/details/Zamora_Ferlinghetti_poetry_reading_July_1990_90P035
http://www.worldcat.org/identities/lccn-n88-630434/

https://global.oup.com/academic/product/the-oxford-book-of-latin-american-poetry-9780195124545?cc=us&lang=en&#
https://books.google.com/books?id=lblcBR7uDoYC&printsec=frontcover#v=onepage&q&f=false
https://labloga.blogspot.com/2014/10/the-violent-foam-returning-to-poet.html
https://www.youtube.com/watch?v=DGMqZWv8-zI
https://www.youtube.com/watch?v=6wTmdBjawEY
https://web.archive.org/web/20060205164641/http://www.colorado.edu/cwa/bios.html?id=79&year=2001 Daisy Zamora Page
https://mellenpress.com/book/New-Concept-of-Art-and-Popular-Culture-in-Nicaragua-Since-the-Revolution-in-1979-an-Analytical-Essay-and-Compendium-of-185-Illustrations/3206/]  
Daizy Zamora en MarcaAcme.com

1950 births
Living people
Nicaraguan feminists
Nicaraguan women activists
21st-century Nicaraguan poets
People from Managua
Nicaraguan emigrants to the United States
Writers from the San Francisco Bay Area
Nicaraguan women poets
21st-century Nicaraguan women writers
Central American University (Managua) alumni